The Culture of Critique series is a trilogy of books by Kevin B. MacDonald, an antisemitic conspiracy theorist, white supremacist and a retired professor of evolutionary psychology. MacDonald claims that evolutionary psychology provides the motivations behind Jewish group behavior and culture. Through the series, MacDonald asserts that Jews as a group have biologically evolved to be highly ethnocentric and hostile to the interests of white people. He asserts Jewish behavior and culture are central causes of antisemitism, and promotes conspiracy theories about alleged Jewish control and influence in government policy and political movements.

The overwhelming majority of academic and journalistic reviews of MacDonald's work have dismissed it as pseudoscience grounded in conspiracy theories, and replete with misrepresentations and cherry-picking of sources. The work is regarded as having been motivated by MacDonald's antisemitic bias, rather than being an honest product of academic research.

The trilogy includes:
 A People That Shall Dwell Alone: Judaism as a Group Evolutionary Strategy, With Diaspora Peoples
 Separation and Its Discontents: Toward an Evolutionary Theory of Anti-Semitism
 The Culture of Critique: An Evolutionary Analysis of Jewish Involvement in Twentieth-Century Intellectual and Political Movements

Series
The first books constitute what is known as MacDonald's "trilogy."  In this trilogy, he describes Judaism as a "group evolutionary strategy" to enhance the ability of Jews to out-compete non-Jews for resources. He argues that Judaism fosters in Jews a series of marked genetic traits, including above-average verbal intelligence and a strong tendency toward collectivist behavior. MacDonald also notes a negative shift in tone from the first book to the third, and attributes it to having learned more, read more, and "changed greatly" in that time. MacDonald's trilogy has been described as significant for "its potential to forge a standardized anti-Semitic critique in the far right."

The trilogy was followed by additional writings on the topic published by the Occidental Quarterly, a periodical MacDonald currently edits:
Understanding Jewish Influence: A Study in Ethnic Activism
Can the Jewish Model Help the West Survive?

A People That Shall Dwell Alone (1994)

MacDonald describes Judaism as having or being a "group evolutionary strategy" aimed at limiting exogamy, enforcing cultural segregation, promoting in-group charity and economic cooperation, and regulating in-group marriage and births to achieve high levels of intelligence, ability to acquire resources, parenting care, and group allegiance. He examines evidence from Jewish history, culture, and genetics supporting his thesis, arguing that Judaism is based on a strong—and possibly genetically based—predisposition to ethnocentrism characteristic of Middle Eastern cultures generally but exacerbated as a result of selective effects resulting from Jewish cultural practices. He considers the use of the complex and extensive Jewish scriptures and the high prestige of Rabbinic learning as eugenic mechanisms for promoting Jewish verbal intelligence and dexterity.

Separation and Its Discontents (1998)

Developing his work in A People That Shall Dwell Alone, MacDonald examines antisemitism as a test case for an evolutionary analysis of ethnic conflict in general, applying social identity theory to three critical periods of institutionalized antisemitism: the Roman Empire in the fourth century; the Iberian inquisitions from the fourteenth century; and German Nazism in the period 1933–45. He argues that antisemitism is a consequence of resource competition between groups in which each group is rationally pursuing its own interests rather than a manifestation of irrational malice by non-Jewish out-groups, and asserts that Jews, particularly strongly identified Jews, will be relatively prone to self-deception by ignoring or rationalizing negative information about themselves and their in-group. Finally, he discusses whether Judaism has ceased to be an evolutionary strategy because of the current levels of intermarriage among some groups of diaspora Jews, arguing that it has not ceased to be so and that it continues to flourish.

The Culture of Critique (1998)

MacDonald examines Boasian anthropology, political radicalism, psychoanalysis, the Frankfurt School, and The New York Intellectuals, arguing that Jews dominated these intellectual movements and that a strong sense of Jewish identity was characteristic of the great majority of the individuals in these movements. He argues that these individuals were pursuing a Jewish ethnic agenda in establishing and participating in these movements, while writing that the Jewish community does not constitute a unified movement and that only a small and elite minority of that community participated in these movements.

He claims Jewish efforts to shape United States immigration policy were in opposition to what he sees as the interests of the peoples of non-Jewish European descent, particularly the peoples of Northern and Western Europe. He concludes the book by claiming that the intellectual movements he examines are movements that are either "Jewish" by nature or Jewish-controlled: "the result has been a widening gulf between the cultural successes of Jews and Gentiles and a disaster for society as a whole."

Describing the evolution of his thinking over the course of his writing the trilogy, MacDonald says in his preface to the 2002 paperback edition of The Culture of Critique:
I think there is a noticeable shift in my tone from the first book to the third simply because (I'd like to think) I knew a lot more and had read a lot more. People often say after reading the first book that they think I really admire Jews, but they are unlikely to say that about the last two and especially about CofC. That is because by the time I wrote CofC I had changed greatly from the person who wrote the first book.

Understanding Jewish Influence (2004)

With an introduction by Samuel T. Francis, Understanding Jewish Influence outlines what MacDonald claims are the "background traits" of Jewish influence. To MacDonald these traits consist of:

Hyper-ethnocentrism
High verbal intelligence and consequent wealth
Psychological intensity
Social and political aggression

He goes on to assert the influence of these traits upon current events concerning Zionism, neoconservatism, immigration, and Middle Eastern warfare waged by Western powers.

Criticism
The series has been widely criticized by academics and researchers as antisemitic and scientifically unsupportable.

Slate magazine carried an article by Judith Shulevitz, then Art and Entertainment editor of the Culturebox, entitled "Evolutionary Psychology's Anti-Semite," continuing the discussion followed by an attempted rebuttal by MacDonald.  According to Shulevitz, MacDonald's arguments are prescriptive: "Toward the end of the third book, MacDonald lays out his solution for restoring what he calls 'parity' between the Jews and other ethnic groups: systematic discrimination against Jews in college admission and employment and heavy taxation of Jews 'to counter the Jewish advantage in the possession of wealth.'" MacDonald replied that in the actual passage from The Culture of Critique quoted by Shulevitz, he was speaking hypothetically of the consequences of competition between ethnic groups of differing abilities.
Mark Potok of the Southern Poverty Law Center has said of MacDonald that "he put the anti-Semitism under the guise of scholarly work... Kevin MacDonald’s work is nothing but gussied-up anti-Semitism. At base it says that Jews are out to get us through their agenda... His work is bandied about by just about every neo-Nazi group in America."

The Anti-Defamation League has included MacDonald in its list of American extremists, Extremism in America, and has written a report on his views and ties. According to the ADL, MacDonald's views on Jews mimic those of antisemites from the late 19th and early 20th centuries.

Academic response

In a letter to Slate magazine, Harvard University psychology professor Steven Pinker wrote:

The suggestion that scholars "can't ignore bad ideas" is a nonstarter. In science there are a thousand bad ideas for every good one. "Doing battle" against all of them is not an option for mere mortals, and doing battle against some of them is a tacit acknowledgment that those have enough merit to exceed the onerous threshold of attention-worthiness. MacDonald's ideas, as presented in summaries that would serve as a basis for further examination, do not pass that threshold, for many reasons: 

1. By stating that Jews promulgate scientific hypotheses because they are Jewish, he is engaging in ad hominem argumentation that is outside the bounds of normal scientific discourse and an obvious waste of time to engage. MacDonald has already announced that I will reject his ideas because I am Jewish, so what's the point of replying to them? 

2. MacDonald's main axioms – group selection of behavioral adaptations, and behaviorally relevant genetic cohesiveness of ethnic groups – are opposed by powerful bodies of data and theory, which Tooby, Cosmides, and many other evolutionary psychologists have written about in detail. Of course any assumption can be questioned, but there are no signs that MacDonald has taken on the burden of proof of showing that the majority view is wrong. 

3. MacDonald's various theses, even if worthy of scientific debate individually, collectively add up to a consistently invidious portrayal of Jews, couched in value-laden, disparaging language. It is impossible to avoid the impression that this is not an ordinary scientific hypothesis. 

4. The argument, as presented in the summaries, fails two basic tests of scientific credibility: a control group (in this case, other minority ethnic groups), and a comparison with alternative hypotheses (such as Thomas Sowell's convincing analysis of "middlemen minorities" such as the Jews, presented in his magisterial study of migration, race, conquest, and culture). Pinker closed by commenting that he had "not plowed through MacDonald's trilogy and therefore run the complementary risks of being unfair to his arguments, and of not refuting them resoundingly enough."

A paper by David Lieberman, a Holocaust researcher at Brandeis University, alleges that MacDonald has distorted evidence and chosen evidence selectively for rhetorical purposes.

John Tooby, past president of the Human Behavior and Evolution Society and a professor of anthropology at the University of California, Santa Barbara, insists that MacDonald is not an evolutionary psychologist, and that he advocates a generally discredited view of natural selection. Tooby, the founder of MacDonald's field of evolutionary psychology, criticized MacDonald in an article for the Salon website in 2000: "MacDonald's ideas—not just on Jews—violate fundamental principles of the field."

Reviewing MacDonald's A People That Shall Dwell Alone: Judaism as a Group Evolutionary Strategy in The Jewish Quarterly Review, Sander Gilman, professor of the Liberal Arts and Medicine at the University of Illinois at Chicago describes MacDonald's arguments about a Jewish group evolutionary strategy as "bizarre." According to Gilman, "MacDonald recasts all of the hoary old myths about Jewish psychological difference and its presumed link to Jewish superior intelligence in contemporary sociobiological garb." Gilman also charges that "MacDonald manipulates his sources rather shamelessly," including Gilman's own work. Gilman concludes that MacDonald's book "is the most recent chapter in the continued myth-building concerning Jewish superior intelligence and achievement. It is, like the numerous earlier works, of interest in how positive images turn into the means by which Jewish difference is stressed and Jewish acculturation is shown to be pathological."

Reviewing Macdonald's A People That Shall Dwell Alone in the Journal for the Scientific Study of Religion, Eugen Schoenfeld, Professor Emeritus of Sociology at Georgia State University, commented that "the book is controversial, not only because of its theoretical approach, but also, and perhaps primarily, because of sloppy scholarship." Schoenfeld writes that Macdonald "selects historical incidents that can be used to support his thesis and conveniently omits others that challenge his thesis." Schoenfeld points to what he sees as Macdonald's "unfamiliarity with both the sociological frame of reference and historical knowledge," and as an example, notes that Macdonald's comparison of Jewish collectivism during the biblical period with eighteenth- and nineteenth-century English individualism "indicates a total ignorance of the impact of industrialization on Western societies."

On the other hand, Laurence Loeb of the University of Utah, writing for the Jewish Folklore and Ethnology Review in 1997, gave A People That Shall Dwell Alone a mostly positive review, calling it a "tour-de-force" that, despite containing "quite a number of errors, some of them glaring," nonetheless represented a "watershed contribution to the understanding of Judaism and Jewish life" based on a "cautious, careful assembling of evidence."

Reviewing Macdonald's Separation and Its Discontents in the American Jewish Society Review in 2000, Zev Garber, Professor of Jewish Studies at Los Angeles Valley College, wrote that MacDonald works from the assumption that the dual Torah is the blueprint of the eventual Jewish dominion over the world and that he sees contemporary antisemitism, the Holocaust, and attacks against Israel as "provoked by Jews themselves. In this scenario, Jews imagine themselves as innocent victims of hatred and violence." Garber concludes that Macdonald's "rambling who-is-who-isn't roundup of Jews responsible for the 'Jewish Problem' borders on the irrational and is conducive to misrepresentation."

Daniel Kriegman, an evolutionary psychologist, produced a 50-page analysis criticizing MacDonald's work as "pseudo-scientific theorizing," although it does not appear that he ever published it: he did send it to MacDonald, who has since responded.  He wrote that MacDonald "believes his own nonsense."  Kriegman remarked in an email, "MacDonald is not the first person to avoid the narcissistic injury of having his ideas rejected by concluding that there was a conspiracy against him rather than becoming aware of the substandard nature [as evidenced in his trilogy] of his thinking."

A history professor at MacDonald's university, Don Schwarz, called MacDonald's claims about Jewish history "unsupportable." Philosophy Professor Warren Weinstein said that MacDonald's work was not science at all, but "something else, masquerading as science": and that "It is in the great tradition of Nazi and Stalinist science which clearly and scientifically proved that their respective insanities were objectively true and defensible."

Academic Jaff Schatz has accused MacDonald of misrepresenting and misusing his work.

John Hartung, the former associate editor of the Journal of Neurosurgical Anesthesiology and an associate professor of anesthesiology at the State University of New York, said that MacDonald's The Culture of Critique was "quite disturbing, seriously misinformed about evolutionary genetics, and suffering from a huge blind spot about the nature of Christianity."

In a 2000 review in the journal Shofar, reviewer Jefferson A. Singer wrote that he considered the book to be "written out of a deep and destructive hatred for Jews," and questioned the  editorial policy of the books' publisher, Praeger, in "bringing a book of such dubious scientific merit to a larger audience and in giving it an air of legitimacy it does not deserve."

In March 2018, Nathan Cofnas, a philosophy graduate student at the University of Oxford, published a critique of MacDonald's theory in the journal Human Nature where he concluded that MacDonald relied "on systematically misrepresented sources and cherry-picked facts." The paper was downloaded on more occasions in a single month than the rest of the journal's articles typically receive in a full year. Cofnas's article prompted a response defending MacDonald from Edward Dutton, a theologian and YouTuber affiliated with the Ulster Institute for Social Research. Dutton's response was rejected by Human Nature, and was instead published by Evolutionary Psychological Science. The attention prompted by Cofnas's paper was itself commented on. Anthropologist Robert Boyd of the Arizona State described the topic itself as "totally toxic," Steven Pinker described MacDonald's and Dutton's arguments as "extraordinarily weak," while Aryeh Tuchman of the Anti-Defamation League said that the renewed attention falsely implied that MacDonald's antisemitic tropes have academic legitimacy.

See also
Dominant minority
Middleman minority
Ethnocentrism
Model minority
Scientific racism

References

External links
"The Marx of the anti-Semites" – critical review by John Derbyshire in The American Conservative.
"The Conservatism of Fools" – MacDonald's reply to Derbyshire's review
John Derbyshire's comments on responses to his review
"Jews Will Be Jews: A Scientific Racialism for the 21st Century" – critical review by David Isadore Lieberman.

Ethnocentrism
Antisemitic publications
1994 non-fiction books
1998 non-fiction books
Judaic studies
Fascist books